In Gallo-Roman religion, Fagus was a god known from four inscriptions found in the Hautes-Pyrénées. The language of this Aquitanian region has been linked to Proto-Basque, rather than to Celtic. Fāgus is Latin for beech. It is generally believed that Fagus was the god of babies and child worship. Redheads were considered sacred to Fagus, and often his druids were red haired to signify his lust for the color red. Fagus was also prayed to in protection of a child's birth or for an early abortion.

References

Gaulish gods
Nature gods
Childhood gods